Olga Aleksandrovna Sutulova (born 4 May 1980) is a Russian theater and film actress.

Biography 
Olga Sutulova was born in Leningrad, Russian SFSR, Soviet Union (now Saint Petersburg, Russia), into a family of mathematicians and engineers. She studied English from the age of five and then went to a school with in-depth study of English. For a few months, Olga left for Oxford on a student exchange program. But her relationship with teachers and classmates at the Oxford school did not work out. 
Afterwards, Olga went to a vocational school at a shipping company, passed all the exams perfectly, but the parents of Olga did not want their daughter to be a technician-mechanic, and some time later enrolled her in school named after Alexander II in Peterhof. At the age of 15 she met the screenwriter Oleg Danilov and soon starred in the television series Waiting Room.

After finishing high school, Olga entered a university to study history. She graduated from the acting department VGIK (workshop of Iosif Rayhelgauz).

In late 2009 Olga married actor Yevgeny Stychkin. They starred together in the 2012 Russian-Greek film God Loves Caviar and in the 2017 TV miniseries Trotsky.

Selected filmography
 1998: Waiting Room as Sveta
 1998: Contract with Death as Anya 
 2001: The Arena as Livia
 2001: Give Me Moonlight as daughter
 2002: Investigation Held by ZnaToKi: "Pood of gold" as Jenya
 2007: Attack on Leningrad as Nina Tsvetkova
 2008: Nirvana as Alisa
 2012: God Loves Caviar as Helena
 2017: Trotsky as Natalia Sedova
2019: Russian Affairs as Alisa Olkhovskaya
2020: The Last Minister as Nechaeva

References

External links
 

Living people
1980 births
Russian film actresses
Russian television actresses
Russian stage actresses
Actresses from Saint Petersburg
Gerasimov Institute of Cinematography alumni